The Missionary Society of St. Columban (abbreviated as S.S.C.M.E. or SSC), commonly known as the Columbans, is a missionary Catholic society of apostolic life of Pontifical Right founded in Ireland in 1917 and approved by the Vatican in 1918. Initially it was known as the Maynooth Mission to China. Members may be priests, seminarians or lay workers. Fr John Blowick, one of the two founders of the Society, also founded the Missionary Sisters of St. Columban to share in their work.  The society is dedicated to St. Columbanus.  The current international headquarters is in Hong Kong.

Foundation
The Society was founded through the inspiration of the Reverend (later Bishop) Edward Galvin of Ireland (1882-1956). Galvin had considered serving as a missionary as a young man, but he was dissuaded by the concerns of his parents over such a life. He entered St Patrick's College (usually called Maynooth Seminary) near Dublin to study for the priesthood for his native Diocese of Cork, and was ordained in 1909. Due to an oversupply of clergy for that diocese, his bishop suggested that Galvin offer his service in the United States, until such time as there would be an opening in Cork. Galvin followed his advice and went to the Roman Catholic Diocese of Brooklyn in New York City, where he was assigned to Holy Rosary Parish.

While serving there, Galvin came to know John M. Fraser, a Canadian priest, who stayed there while en route back to China. Galvin shared with Fraser his interest serving in China. Galvin told Fraser that he had read everything he could about that nation in the Brooklyn Public Library and asked to accompany Fraser back to China. Fraser discouraged Galvin's interest but finally told him that he would need the authorization of his bishop for this action. Galvin wrote and received this permission. Galvin departed for China on 25 February 1912.

Mission to China
Galvin first traveled to Toronto, Ontario, Canada, to meet Fraser. Together they traveled across the country to Vancouver, where they set sail for China on the RMS Empress of India (1890). He then began to serve in Zhejiang (then spelled Chekiang), where he spent the next four years. During that time, Galvin was appalled at the poverty and began to request help and assistance from his connections back in Ireland. He was even more appalled by what he called their 'spiritual poverty'. Here were millions of friendly and industrious people who, because of the lack of missionaries, knew nothing of Jesus Christ.

He was joined in 1916 by two other priests, Frs. Patrick O'Reilly and Joseph O'Leary. The three soon realized that some kind of organized effort would be needed to adequately deal with the situation. His new colleagues urged Galvin to return to Ireland to establish a new missionary Society. Galvin was hesitant but eventually felt called to take this step.

In June 1916, Galvin through to the United States on his way back to Ireland. He met with bishops and priests everywhere he went, presenting his proposal. He found general support and encouragement. He arrived in Ireland that August, where he proceeded to his alma mater, Maynooth, and began to recruit among the seminarians there for his proposed society. A local Curate, Thomas Roynane, introduced Galvin to one of the seminary faculty, John Blowick, who agreed to join the endeavor and was to prove an important contributor to the development of the Society. Within two months of his arrival, Galvin had recruited five more priests, bringing the new Maynooth Mission to China to a total of eight members.

The Society
Galvin then presented his proposal to the Holy See, which gave its blessing. Galvin and Blowick spent 1917 laying the foundations for the society. Formal approval for the group, now named the Society of St. Columban, was given by Rome on 29 June 1918, and a new seminary was immediately founded in Ireland to train new members for the missions. In the United States, a house soon was opened near Omaha, Nebraska, where another seminary was opened within a few years. The Society grew to number 40 priests and 60 seminarians by 1920. Galvin then led the first band of the Society to open their mission in the Hanyang District (modern day Wuhan, China). Galvin was named Apostolic Prefect of the Apostolic Prefecture of Hanyang by the Holy See in 1923 and later made the Apostolic Vicar of the promoted Apostolic Vicariate of Hanyang in 1927, with Galvin being consecrated as its titular bishop (it became a diocese under him in 1946, suffragan of Hankou).

As they began their work, the missionaries encountered various calamities to which the region was subject, ranging from famines to flooding. They also soon found themselves in the middle of a civil war between the forces of the Guominjun Nationalist Army and the Chinese Communist Party, which lasted for the next three decades. This social instability allowed warlords to flourish and mission stations were routinely threatened by bandits. Supplies were often stolen en route and mission workers were frequently kidnapped. On 15 July 1929, Communist Army bandits captured Columban Fr Timothy Leonard. After a few days as a prisoner, they murdered him. Others, though, were taken captive and released, but one, Father Cornelius Tierney, died after three months of harsh captivity. In the fall of 1932, Chiang Kai-shek's nationalist republican troops began attacking the Communists with a vigor never seen before. The Communists fell back on all fronts, and, once more, people could move about with relative safety.

"The reign of terror," wrote one Columban, "far from weakening the appeal of the Catholic Church in this area, seems to have strengthened it." It was an extraordinary time as thousands expressed a sincere desire to enter the Church.

In 1933, the Holy See designated a new territory for the Columbans and Fr Patrick Cleary was appointed in charge of the Apostolic Vicariate of Nancheng (in Nancheng County, south of Hanyang). The Japanese invasion of China in 1937 saw the Society challenged to care for both civilians and soldiers, as major outbreaks of Cholera swept the populace. This was soon followed by the outbreak of World War II, when members of the Society from the Allies of World War II had to be repatriated or face house arrest. The war had just ended when it became clear that Communist forces under Mao Tse-tung would soon defeat the Nationalists under Chiang Kai-shek. In 1946, the Holy See entrusted a new mission, known as Huchow, to the Columban Fathers.

Three years later, the Communists took over this area, and, before long, they were in control of all of China. Several Columbans were thrown into jail and eventually all the Columban priests and Sisters were expelled. Bishops Galvin and Cleary were expelled in 1952.

By 1954, every one of the 146 Columbans serving in China was "expelled forever." On 19 September 1952, a weary, haggard man stumbled across the Communist China border into British concession enclave Hong Kong. Forty years of heroic missionary service had ended; Bishop Galvin was even branded a "criminal." Three-and-a-half years later, death came quietly for this great Catholic missionary.

Extension of the mission beyond China
From 1929 onwards, the Society extended its mission to the Philippines (1929), Korea (1933), Burma (1936) and Japan (1948).

The Society was active for many years in Australia, mainly in support of the mission to China.
 
When mainland China was closed to missionaries in the 1950s, the Society responded to the urgent call from Latin America and Columbans went to new urban settlements in Peru and Chile. The Society also responded to the missionary needs of the Church in Fiji (1952).

Still more recently, the Society has gone to Pakistan, Taiwan, Brazil, Jamaica and Belize. Due to diminishing resources, the Society had to withdraw its commitment to Belize, Jamaica and Brazil.
 
Columbans first went to Pakistan in 1979 at the request of the Bishop of Lahore in Punjab Province and in 1983, the Columbans began to work in the Roman Catholic Diocese of Hyderabad in Sindh province.

Notable Columbans

Superiors general
(from Ireland unless otherwise mentioned)
Bishop Edward J. Galvin (founder, see above, also first bishop of Hanyang)
Michael O'Dwyer, (1924 – 1947) 
Jeremiah Dennehy, (1947 – 1952) 
Timothy Connolly, (1952 – 1962) 
James Kielt, (1962 – 1970) 
Richard Steinhilber, (1970 – 1976) 
Tony O'Brien, (1976 – 1982) 
Bernard Cleary, (1982 – 1988) 
Nicholas Murray, (1988 – 2000) 
Brendan O'Sullivan, (2000 – 2006) 
Tommy Murphy, (2006 – 2012.09.20) 
(Australia) Kevin O'Neill, (2012.09.20 – 2018.09.22)
Tim Mulroy (2018.09.22 - ...)

Prelates from their ranks
(by year of demise)
1949: Owen McPolin (임 오엔), Apostolic Prefect emeritus of Kwoszu South Korea)
1952: Patrizio Tommaso Brennan (안 파트리치오), Apostolic Prefect of Gwangju 광주 (South Korea)
1956 Edward J. Galvin (Society founder, see above, first bishop of Hanyang April 11, 1946 – February 23, 1956)
1958: Fr. Patrizio Usher, Apostolic Prefect of Bhamo (Myanmar)
1970: Patrick Cleary (利伯高), Bishop of Nancheng 南城 (China)
1970: Thomas F. Quinlan (구 토마), Bishop emeritus of Chuncheon 춘천 (South Korea)
1976: Harold Henry, D.D. (현 하롤드), first Roman Catholic Archbishop emeritus of Kwangju/ Gwangju 광주 (South Korea)(1962-1971) and Apostolic Administrator of Jeju 제주 (South Korea)
1983: Henry Byrne, Bishop emeritus of Iba (Philippines)
1991: Patrick H. Cronin, Metropolitan Archbishop emeritus of Cagayan de Oro (Philippines)
1994: Thomas Stewart (박 토마), Bishop emeritus of Chuncheon 춘천 (South Korea)
1997: John Dooley, Apostolic Delegate (papal diplomatic envoy) emeritus to Indochina
2000: John James Howe, Bishop emeritus of Myitkyina (Myanmar)
2010: James Edward Michaels (권야고보), Auxiliary Bishop emeritus of Wheeling–Charleston (USA)

Other Notable Columbans
Father John Blowick (co-founder and second superior general)
Father W. Aedan McGrath, missionary to PR China who suffered false imprisonment in the early 1950s
Father James Stuart, who saved the lives of many refugees and American airmen in Northern Burma during World War II. In appreciation of the valuable service he rendered British and American Intelligence, the "Fighting Father", as he was referred to afterwards, was awarded the O.B.E.
Father Niall O'Brien, missionary to the Philippines who suffered false imprisonment in the “Negros Nine” case of the 1980s. 
Father Peter Nguyen Van Hung, anti-human trafficking activist in Taiwan.
Father Shay Cullen, campaigner for the elimination of child prostitution in the Philippines  and defender of human rights , co-founder of the PREDA Foundation
Father Robert McCulloch, an Australian who served in Pakistan from 1978 to 2011. He was decorated by the Government of Pakistan for his services to health and education in 2012.
Father Seán McDonagh SSC, is an Irish Columban missionary priest and Eco-theologian.

Columban Martyrs
Father Patrick Thomas Brennan, Prefect Apostolic of Kwangju, a prisoner who was killed by North Korean forces, September 24, 1950, along with Fr. Cusack and Fr. O'Brien.
Father Frank Canavan, died in a Communist internment camp in Korea in 1950.
Father Anthony (Tony) Collier (1913-1950), killed by North Korean forces, June 27, 1950, first non-Korean killed during the Korean War.
Father Thomas Cusack, parish priest of Mokopo, a prisoner who was killed by North Korean forces, September 24, 1950.
Father John O'Brien, priest of Mokopo, a prisoner who was killed by North Korean forces, September 24, 1950.
Father Francis Douglas (1910-1943), New Zealand missionary murdered by Japanese soldiers the Philippines.
Father Rufus Halley, missionary to the Philippines, who was murdered in 2001 Masked men murder Irish priest in Philippines.
Father Cornelius Tierney kidnapped in China, died in captivity in 1931
Father Timothy Leonard killed when Chinese Communist bandits attacked his church in 1929
Father Peter Fallon kidnapped and killed by Japanese forces in 1945.
Father John Heneghan kidnapped and killed by Japanese forces in 1945
Father Thomas Flynn killed by Huk Communists in 1950 in the Philippines
Father John Walsh, missionary priest, killed in Burma in 1964 by pro-government forces.

Timeline
 1918 - Formal approval of Maynooth Mission to China
 1918 - Seminary founded in Shurle, Co. Galway
 1920 - First Mission to China
 1921 - Columban house opened in Melbourne, Australia
 1922 - Opening of Columban Seminary in Bellevue, Nebraska, USA
 1927 - Dowdstown House, Navan, Co. Meath, bought by Society
 1929 - Mission to Philippines  
 1933 - Mission to Korea
 1936 - Mission to Burma
 1941 - Society moved completely from Shrule to Navan 
 1948 - Mission to Japan
 1950 - Malate/Manila Martyrs, Columbans Fallon, Heneghan, Kelly and Monaghan killed in Philippines
 1950 - Columbans Collier, Reilly, Maginn, Cannavan, Brennan, Cusack, and O'Brien killed in Korean War
 1951 - Mission to Fiji commenced
 1952 - Missions to Chile and Peru
 1954 - Columbans expelled from China
 1979 - Mission to Pakistan and Mission to Taiwan
 1979 - Columbans leave Burma
 1985 - Mission to Brazil commenced
 1986 - Missions to Jamaica and Belize
 1999 - Mission to US/Mexico Border 
 2008 - General Council moves from Ireland to Hong Kong
 2016 - Mission to Myanmar (formerly Burma) reopens
 2018 - Centenary Celebrations

Seminaries

Dalgan Park, Shrule, Co. Galway (1918-1941)
In 1918 the society founded St Columban's College, Dalgan Park, Shrule, on the Galway/Mayo border, as their seminary. The seminary moved 1941 to Dowdstown House, Navan, Co. Meath.

Dalgan Park, Navan, Co. Meath
Dowdstown House, Navan, Co. Meath, was bought in 1927 by the Columbans, from the Taylor family, and the Columbans moved in in 1929 before moving completely from Shrule in 1941 and renamed it Dalgan Park. Dalgan Park Navan served as the headquarters of the society until 1967 when it moved to Dublin, and in 1981 it was designated a retreat centre for the Diocese. The Irish Missionaries Union Institute, and the Columban Lay Missionaries are based in Dalgan Park. The Columban Archive is stored at Navan as well. The Columban's ran a parttime postgrad diploma in theology(Education & Religion) and a MA in Theology (Ecology & Religion). The MA in Ecology and Faith was in collaboration with Lampeter College at the University of Wales in 2009 the course moved to All Hallows College and was validated by DCU. The Faith and Mission course for missionaries was run by the columbans from dalgan park was developed with the IMU, it was followed by a course Mission and Justice.

Columban Seminary Omaha, Nebraska
A house was opened in Nebraska in 1918, in 1921 construction began on the Columban seminary in Bellevue, Nebraska. It was dedicated in June 1922 by Archbishop Jeremiah J. Harty of Omaha, and accepting its first students in September 1922.

Far East magazine 
Far East was founded in 1918 and is the official magazine of the Missionary Society of St Columban, it is published seven times a year. Founded in 1918, Fr. John Heneghan murdered by the Japanese in Manila in World War II, was the first editor of Far East. In 2016, Sarah MacDonald became the first lay and first female editor of the magazine. Other editors have included Dr. Edward (Ned) Maguire (1925-1936), Fr. Daniel Conneely (1936-1965), Fr. Edward Percy Walshe (1970-1977), Fr. Sean A. Dunne (1977-1986), Fr Cyril Lovett SSC (2003-2016),  Fr Alo Connaughton(1993-2003), Fr. W.S. McGoldrick(US Far East) and Fr Michael O'Neill SSC (who also edited the in house columban publication Columban Intercom).
The Australian and Nebraska Columban Societies publish Far East Magazines. The Far East magazine in the US, was renamed The Columban Mission.

References

Sources
St Columban's Missionary Magazine - 
GigaCatholic  
Catholic Liturgical Calendar -

External links
International Columban website 
Columban Sisters website

 
Christian organizations established in 1916
Roman Catholic missionaries in China
Catholic Church in China
Catholic missions
Societies of apostolic life
St Patrick's College, Maynooth